Earl or Earle Richardson may refer to:

 Earl Richardson (baseball) (1924–2003), American Negro League baseball player
 Earl S. Richardson (born 1943), American university president
 Earl S. Richardson (politician) (1879–1943), American politician from Mississippi
 Earle Wilton Richardson (1912–1935), American painter